Attorney General Aspinall may refer to:

Butler Cole Aspinall (1830–1875), Attorney General of Victoria
Owen Aspinall (1927–1997), Attorney General of American Samoa